Rudolf Hans Bartsch (born 11 February 1873 in Graz, Styria – died 7 February 1952 in St. Peter in Graz), was an Austrian military officer, and writer. He was nominated for the Nobel Prize in Literature six times.

Life and work
Bartsch wrote novels and short stories, which, according to today's critics often glorify the old nostalgic Austria. Gero von Wilpert ( for a very fertile, non-critical narrator of the old Austria – kind with sentimental novels and short stories, cute and bittersweet love stories of playful levity) ...<ref> 'Encyclopedia of world literature, ''', Ed Gero von Wilpert . Under al. numerous . Professional scholar , DTV , München 2004 ,  .</ref>
His novel about Franz Schubert, Schwammerl (mushrooms), one of the most successful Austrian books before World War II, served in 1916 as a template to the operetta Das Dreimäderlhaus by the composer Heinrich Berté, which was also filmed several times.

Bartsch adapted the mythological poem Autumn Chorus to Pan, from ancient works about the god Pan and the seasons. It tells the signs of the cycle of life and the transience of the earth in the sense of the changing seasons. The work gained greater prominence when it was set to music in January 1911 by Joseph Marx, who was, at the time, one of the most played song composers of Austria. It was set as a one-movement cantata for mixed choir, boys' choir, organ and large orchestra. This is the first orchestral work written by Marx. The Autumn Chorus to Pan was recorded in June 2008 by the BBC Symphony Orchestra & Chorus under Jiří Bělohlávek together with other choral works by Joseph Marx for the British label Chandos Records.

Streets were named after him in his hometown of Graz plus in Leibnitz and Mureck.

Awards and honors

freeman the city of Graz, 1932
Peter Rosegger Prize, 1951

Novels
Zwölf aus der Steiermark, 1908
Elisabeth Kött, 1909
Schwammerl. Schubert-Roman, 1912
Das deutsche Leid. Ein Landschafts-Roman, 1912
Die Geschichte von der Hannerl und ihren Liebhabern, 1913
Der letzte Student, Ullstein, Berlin 1913
ER. Ein Buch der Andacht, 1915
Der Flieger, 1915
Frau Utta und der Jäger, 1915
Lukas Rabesam, 1917
Der junge Dichter. Roman, 1918
Heidentum. Die Geschichte eines Vereinsamten, 1919
Ewiges Arkadien!, 1920
Seine Jüdin oder Jakob Böhmes Schusterkugel, 1921
Ein Landstreicher, 1921
Die Haindlkinder
Das Tierchen. Die Geschichte einer kleinen Grisette, 1922
Die Salige
Venus und das Mädchengrab. Liebesgeschichte eines Sonderlings, 1926
Die Verliebten und ihre Stadt, 1927
Die Apotheke zur blauen Gans. Roman aus seltsamem Grenzland, 1928
Wild und frei. Thema mit Variationen, 1928
Der große alte Kater. Eine Schopenhauer-Geschichte, 1929
Die Verführerin. Eine Wiener Geschichte, 1930
Der große und der kleine Klaus, 1931
Das Lächeln der Marie Antoinette, 1932
Ein Deutscher. Zsgestellt aus Fragmenten der Erinnergen des Christoph Magnus von Raithenau, 1933
Der große Traum der kleinen Wienerin. Eine heitere Staatsaktion, 1936
Brüder im Sturm, 1940
Wenn Majestäten lieben, 1949

Short Stories, NovellasBittersüße Liebesgeschichten, 1910Vom sterbenden Rokoko, 1913Unerfüllte GeschichtenFrauen. 3 Novellen, 1918Musik. 3 Novellen, 1923Novellen, 1924Histörchen, 1925

PlaysOhne Gott. Die Tragödie einer Mutter, 1915Fernes Schiff. 3 Akte (6 Bilder) aus dem Leben des großen Kolonisators John Smith, 1934

Essays
 Das Glück des deutschen Menschen, 1927

Literature
Theodor Lessing: Rudolf Hans Bartsch. Ein letztes deutsches Naturdenkmal. Staackmann, Leipzig 1927.
Hans Dolf: Rudolf Hans Bartsch. Bruder des großen Pan. Eine Studie über den Dichter mit einer Auswahl aus seinen Werken. Leykam, Graz 1964.
Sophie Rahaberger: Das religiöse Problem bei Rudolf Hans Bartsch. Univ. Diss., Graz 1959.
References

 External links  Local . Writers Rudolf Hans Bartsch in Baden Baden. Zeitung, September 26, 1925  writer Rudolf Hans Bartsch in Baden Baden.'' newspaper, October 3, 1925  links above

1873 births
1952 deaths
Military personnel from Graz
People from the Duchy of Styria
20th-century Austrian male writers
19th-century Austrian military personnel
20th-century Austrian military personnel